The Battle of Marj Ayyun was a military confrontation fought at Marj Ayyoun near the Litani River (modern-day Lebanon) in June 1179 between the Kingdom of Jerusalem under Baldwin IV and the Ayyubid armies under the leadership of Saladin. It ended in a decisive victory for the Muslims and is considered the first in the long series of Islamic victories under Saladin against the Christians. However, the Christian king, Baldwin IV, who was crippled by leprosy, narrowly escaped being captured in the rout.

Background
In 1177, Saladin's Ayyubid army invaded the Latin Kingdom of Jerusalem from Egypt. In that year King Baldwin surprised and defeated the Saracen host at the Battle of Montgisard.

In 1179, Saladin again invaded the Crusader states, from the direction of Damascus. He based his army at Banias and sent raiding forces to despoil villages and crops near Sidon and the coastal areas. Farmers and townspeople impoverished by Saracen raiders would be unable to pay rent to their Frankish overlords. Unless stopped, Saladin's destructive policy would weaken the Crusader kingdom.

In response, Baldwin moved his army to Tiberias on the Sea of Galilee. From there he marched north-northwest to the stronghold of Safed. Together with the Knights Templar led by Odo of St Amand and a force from the County of Tripoli led by Count Raymond III, Baldwin moved northeast.

Battle
The Kingdom of Jerusalem still hoped for an opportunity to attack Egypt, but they were not strong enough. In 1178 CE, a fortress at Jacob's Ford - a border crossing outpost north of Lake Tiberias, called by the Arab scholars Beit el-Ahzan - was built as a post of defense and a base from which attacks in the future might be made. On the borders, the castles and posts were now under the command of the fierce religious military orders. During the summer of 1179 CE, severe drought gripped the Levant, while minor skirmishes erupted. Saladin offered to pay the Crusaders 100,000 dinars in exchange for halting incursions and dismantling the castle at Jacob's Ford but the Crusaders refused, and hostilities resumed.

From the eastern side of the coastal range, the Crusaders saw Saladin's tents in the distance. Baldwin and his nobles decided to descend to the plain and attack at once. As the Frankish army moved downhill, the mounted troops soon outstripped the foot soldiers. After a few hours' delay, the Crusader army reassembled, then encountered and easily defeated the Saracen raiding forces, who were returning from their forays.

Believing the battle won, the Franks let their guard down. Raymond's knights and Odo of St Amand's Templars moved onto some high ground between the Marj Ayyun and the Litani River. The Crusader infantry rested from their hurried march earlier in the day.

Suddenly, Saladin's main army attacked the Crusaders, defeating them badly. Observers of the time blamed the defeat on Odo of St Amand, who was captured in the battle. King Baldwin barely escaped capture; unable to mount a horse because of his crippling disease, he was carried to safety by a knight as his bodyguard cut a path through the Saracens.

Aftermath
One account suggests, the Templars attacked Saladin's larger force on their own, rather than falling back, warning the king, and fighting with him. William, Archbishop of Tyre, blamed the reckless actions of the Templars for the defeat, as he stated. However, the Templars were not subjects of the king and followed their own policies and strategies.

For the king himself, the battle revealed the deterioration of his physical condition; he could no longer command his armies from horseback. Saladin was able to exploit his victory, laying siege to the new Frankish fortress at Jacob’s Ford and destroying it in August 1179 CE.
Saladin immediately took advantage of his victory by destroying the newly built Le Chastellet stronghold at the Battle of Jacob's Ford. In the years after Marj Ayyun, the Frankish leaders became more cautious and the next two campaigns of note, the Battle of Belvoir Castle (1182) and the Battle of Al-Fule (1183) were strictly defensive in nature.

Soleim Al-Razi was a Muslim physician who compassionately treated wounded crusaders captured by the Muslim forces.

For succession of related campaigns see also
 1177: Battle of Montgisard
 1179: Battle of Jacob's Ford
 1182: Battle of Belvoir Castle
 1183: Battle of Al-Fule
 1187: Battle of Cresson
 1187: Battle of Hattin

Citations

Bibliography

 Smail, R. C. Crusading Warfare 1097–1193. New York: Barnes & Noble Books, (1956) 1995. 
 

 Smail, R. C. Crusading Warfare 1097–1193. New York: Barnes & Noble Books, (1956) 1995. 
 

Battles involving the Ayyubids
Battles involving the Kingdom of Jerusalem
Conflicts in 1179
1179 in Asia
Battles involving the Knights Templar
Battles of Saladin
Principality of Galilee
County of Tripoli
1170s in the Kingdom of Jerusalem